Pitcairnia alata is a species of plant in the family Bromeliaceae. It is endemic to Ecuador, where it is known from only two subpopulations in Zamora-Chinchipe Province.

This epiphyte was initially discovered along the Río Valladolid between Quebrada Honda and Tambo Valladolid. Its natural habitat is the forests of the high Andes. It is threatened by habitat destruction as forest is cleared for agriculture.

Notes

References
 Valencia, R., Pitman, N., León-Yánez, S. and Jørgensen, P.M. (eds). 2000. Libro Rojo de las Plantas Endémicas del Ecuador 2000. Publicaciones del Herbario QCA, Ponticicia Universidad Católica del Ecuador, Quito.

alata
Epiphytes
Endemic flora of Ecuador
Endangered plants
Taxonomy articles created by Polbot